Stella (Stella comunidad) is a community in Pueblo barrio and Calvache barrio, in the municipality of Rincón, Puerto Rico. Its population in 2010 was 1,088.

See also

 List of communities in Puerto Rico
 List of barrios and sectors of Rincón, Puerto Rico

References

Barrios of Rincón, Puerto Rico